Matthieu Boulo (born 11 May 1989) is a French racing cyclist, who currently rides for French amateur team Team Pays de Dinan.

Major results

Cyclo-cross

2006–2007
 3rd National Junior Championships
2008–2009
 1st  Under-23
 2nd National Under-23 Championships
 Challenge La France Under-23
2nd Quelneuc
2009–2010
 1st  National Under-23 Championships
 1st Overall Challenge La France Under-23
1st Besançon
1st Quelneuc
1st St-Quentin
2010–2011
 1st  National Under-23 Championships
 2nd Overall UCI Under-23 World Cup
1st Hoogerheide
1st Pontchâteau
3rd Heusden-Zolder 
 2nd Caubergcross Under-23
 Challenge La France
3rd Saverne
2011–2012
 Challenge La France
2nd Lignières-en-Berry
2nd Rodez
3rd Besançon
2012–2013
 2nd Challenge National Pontchâteau
2013–2014
 3rd Mingant Lanarvily
2017–2018
 3rd Trofeo Joan Soler Copa Espana
 3rd Gran Premi Les Franqueses del Valles
2018–2019
 1st Nittany Lion Cross 2
 2nd  1
 2nd Nittany Lion Cross 1
2019–2020
 Coupe de France
3rd Andrezieux-Boutheon
2021–2022
 Coupe de France
3rd Quelneuc

Road
2010
 3rd Time trial, National Under-23 Road Championships
2011
 9th Overall Tour de Bretagne
 10th Overall Circuit des Ardennes International
2014
 4th Overall Tour de Normandie
 7th Route Adélie
2016
 8th Velothon Wales

References

External links
 

1989 births
Living people
French male cyclists
Sportspeople from Vannes
Cyclo-cross cyclists
Cyclists from Brittany